Mother, I Am Suffocating. This Is My Last Film About You is a 2019 Lesotho bilingual documentary film produced, written and directed by Lemohang Jeremiah Mosese. The film depicts the scenario of personal experiences of the director after his departure from Lesotho who now resides in Germany. The film was released on 9 February 2019 and received critical acclaim for its screenplay and cinematography. The film also received several nominations at international film festivals and was rated as one of the best African films of 2019.

Cast 
 Napo Kalebe
 Moliteli Mokake
 Thato Khobothe
 Tsohle Mojati
 Mercy Koetle
 Pheku Lisema

Synopsis 
On the dusty streets of Lesotho, people stare at a young lady who carries a wooden cross on her back. She looks back at their faces. Taking the form of an extended poetic letter to the protagonist's mother and motherland, the film shifts its focus and perspective between Lesotho, a tiny nation in Southern Africa and Germany where the director lives.

Reception
On Rotten Tomatoes, the film holds an approval rating of 100% based on 5 reviews, with an average rating of 7/10.

Awards and nominations

References

External links 

 

2019 films
Lesotho documentary films
Qatari documentary films
German documentary films
2019 documentary films
Sotho-language films
Films shot in Lesotho
2010s English-language films
2010s German films